The Newcastle University Faculty of Humanities and Social Science (HaSS) is the largest of the three faculties at Newcastle University.

In its current form, the Faculty of Humanities and Social Science contains nine schools, a graduate school and a language centre (INTO).

The faculty offers over seventy undergraduate degrees, postgraduate degrees and research opportunities, and has a number of research centres.

Schools 
The ten schools within the faculty are:
 Architecture, Planning & Landscape
 Arts & Cultures
 Newcastle University Business School
 Education, Communication & Language Sciences
 English Literature, Language & Linguistics
 Geography, Politics & Sociology
 History, Classics & Archaeology
 Newcastle Law School
 Modern Languages
 School X

Research centres 
 Centre for Gender and Women's Studies
 Centre for Learning and Teaching
 Centre for Knowledge, Innovation, Technology and Enterprise
 Centre for Research in Linguistics and Language Sciences
 Centre for Urban and Regional Development Studies
 Global Urban Research Unit (GURU)
 Northern Centre for the History of Medicine
 Policy, Ethics and Life Sciences
McCord Centre for Landscape

References

External links 
 Faculty of Humanities and Social Science at Newcastle University
 HaSS Research Directory at Newcastle University
 History of Newcastle University at Newcastle University

Educational institutions established in 1871
Faculty of Humanities and Social Sciences
1871 establishments in England